The 1996 ITC Suzuka round was the thirteenth and final round of the 1996 International Touring Car Championship season. It took place on 10 November at the Suzuka Circuit.

Dario Franchitti won the first race, starting from ninth position, and Bernd Schneider gained the second one, both driving a Mercedes C-Class.

Manuel Reuter won the title, besides he didn't take points from this round.

Classification

Qualifying

Race 1

Race 2

Standings after the event

Drivers' Championship standings

Manufacturers' Championship standings

 Note: Only the top five positions are included for both sets of drivers' standings.

References

External links
Deutsche Tourenwagen Masters official website

1996 International Touring Car Championship season